Jong Tae-se (romanization used by FIFA, otherwise spelled as  in Japan and Germany; hangul: 정대세, hanja: 鄭大世; born ) is a former professional footballer who played as a forward. Born in Japan, he represented the North Korea national team internationally, notably appearing at the 2010 FIFA World Cup. He is one of few North Koreans who have played in the Japanese J-League and the German 2. Bundesliga.

Early life and nationality
Jong was born in Nagoya, Japan between a father who has South Korean citizenship and a mother who has Joseon citizenship, and became a South Korean national based on the father's family register at the time of birth.

Accordingly, his legal nationality is South Korean. But his mother's nationality is Chōsen-seki, so he could choose the North Korea national team.

His mother sent him to attend a private school in Japan run by Chongryon, a group closely tied to the North Korean government – where he started football at its elementary school club. He later attended Korea University, a private university in Tokyo also funded by Chongryon. Consequently, Jong has said that he and his family identify themselves as North Koreans. Chongryon, North Korea's de facto embassy in Japan, issued a North Korean passport to him. This made him eligible, per FIFA rules, to play for North Korea and resulted in de facto dual nationality.

FIFA and AFC regarded him as de facto dual nationality.

Jong is fluent in Korean and Japanese. He also knows how to speak Portuguese which he learned from his Brazilian teammates at Japan's Kawasaki Frontale. He also speaks German from playing in Germany. He also speaks reasonable English.

Jong publicly emphasized the separation between sportsmanship and politics after the disputes before and during the match between North Korea and Japan on 15 November 2011.

Club career
After joining Kawasaki Frontale in 2006, the striker quickly rose to become one of Kawasaki's best players and one of the best strikers in the J-League. Jong went for a trial with English club Blackburn Rovers in early 2010. After the 2010 World Cup, Jong joined German club VfL Bochum. After one and half seasons in the 2. Bundesliga, Jong transferred to 1. FC Köln in the Bundesliga in January 2012, following an injury to German international Lukas Podolski. However, his time at 1. FC Köln was marred by a lack of playing time.

On 3 January 2013, Jong announced that after he would start playing for the first-division South Korean K-League club, Suwon Samsung Bluewings. He had expressed interest in the move for several months before the announcement, and the Bluewings and Ulsan Hyundai FC had both been negotiating with him. Jong joined the South Korean outfit on 10 January 2013 for a reported fee of €300,000 from 1. FC Köln. After deliberation by K League 1 and FIFA authorities, Jong was registered as a South Korean (domestic) player in the K-League and AFC Champions League competitions.

On 6 April, he scored his debut goal for Suwon in a 3–1 home win against Daegu FC. Two weeks later, 20 April, he scored a hat-trick in a 4–1 win at Daejeon Citizen.

On 8 July 2015, he was bought by Shimizu S-Pulse as an emergency signing as Shimizu were in the drop zone after total points calculation from both stages of the season. He was inserted into the starting lineup on 25 July, Matchday 4 of the 2nd stage, away to his former club Kawasaki Frontale which ended in a 3–2 defeat.

International career
Jong's first international appearance was on 19 June 2007, during a 2008 East Asian Football Championship qualifier match against Mongolia and he scored his first international goal in that game. He went on to score a total of four goals which Korea DPR won the match 7–0. Jong also played at the 2008 East Asian Football Championship and scored two goals in three matches for Korea DPR, receiving top scorer honors along with Park Chu-young, Yeom Ki-hun and Koji Yamase.

Before FIFA 2010 World Cup Jong was also the key figure in Korea DPR's 2010 FIFA World Cup qualification campaign, as they qualified for the World Cup South Africa for the first time in 44 years. Jong had made himself famous for sobbing uncontrollably when the North Korean national anthem was played before the kickoff of Korea DPR's first group stage match at the 2010 FIFA World Cup in South Africa, against Brazil. In that match he assisted Ji Yun-nam's goal in a 2–1 defeat.

Although nicknamed "the People's Rooney" by the English press, he likened his style of play to Didier Drogba.

Career statistics

Club

International 

Scores and results list North Korea's goal tally first, score column indicates score after each Jong goal.

References

External links
Profile at Instagram

FIFA.com – Jong straddles the 38th parallel
Jong Tae-Se's blog 

, from Journeyman Pictures, 19 July 2010

1984 births
Living people
North Korean footballers
North Korea international footballers
North Korean expatriate footballers
South Korean footballers
Kawasaki Frontale players
VfL Bochum players
1. FC Köln players
Suwon Samsung Bluewings players
Shimizu S-Pulse players
Albirex Niigata players
FC Machida Zelvia players
J1 League players
J2 League players
2. Bundesliga players
Bundesliga players
K League 1 players
South Korean expatriate footballers
South Korean people of North Korean origin
North Korean people of Japanese descent
Japanese people of North Korean descent
Japanese people of South Korean descent
Expatriate footballers in Germany
North Korean expatriate sportspeople in Germany
South Korean expatriate sportspeople in Germany
Japanese expatriate sportspeople in Germany
2010 FIFA World Cup players
2011 AFC Asian Cup players
Sportspeople from Nagoya
Zainichi Korean people
Naturalised citizens of North Korea
People's Athletes
Association football forwards
Association football people from Aichi Prefecture